Dominis Garrida Anderson (born February 10, 1930), also popularly known as D.G. Anderson and Andy Anderson, is an American politician, real estate developer and businessman from Honolulu, Hawai'i.  His ethnic background is diverse with Hawaiian, Norwegian, English, Scottish, and Portuguese ancestries.

Anderson owned John Dominis Restaurant in Kaka'ako which he built from the ground up in 1974 and sold after 31 years to Japan-based owner Ocean Investments, LLC. He also built and sold another John Dominis Restaurant in Newport Beach, California.  In the earlier points of his life, he owned the largest camera shop in Hawaii (Waterhouse Photo), the largest hi-fi store (Gems in Hawaii), the largest record store in Hawaii and in Phoenix, Arizona, a toy company called Anekona Toys and a ranching supply store in Kona, Hawaii. Anderson currently owns Michel's at The Colony Surf, a premier oceanfront restaurant in Waikīkī dubbed as the "Most Romantic Restaurant" by the popular TV series " Lifestyle of the Rich and Famous". He also owns commercial real estate properties both in Hawaii and mainland USA.

Anderson's real estate development projects include The Bluffs in Waimea consisting of 23 lots on a lush hillside overlooking the ocean between Waimea bay and Haleiwa town and Sunset Beach Colony consisting of 29 subdivided parcels on beachfront 19.1 acre property fronting Velzyland and Kaunala Bay. Both projects are located on the North Shore on the island of Oahu. Anderson also owned Waimea Golf Club, an 18-hole, 6,646-yard, par-72 course, 239 acre land on the island of the Big Island.

Anderson was a member of the Hawai'i State House of Representatives from 1962 to 1966.  He was a member of the Hawai'i State Senate from 1967 to 1983.  In 1968 and 1972, Anderson ran unsuccessfully to become the Republican Mayor of Honolulu. Anderson served as managing director of Honolulu (under Mayor Frank Fasi) from January 2, 1985, to July 3, 1986. In 1982 and 1986, as Chairman of the Hawai'i Republican Party, he ran for Governor of Hawai'i and lost. In 1986 he lost by a narrow 52% to 48% margin. In 2002, Anderson joined the Hawai'i Democratic Party and ran for the party's nomination for governor.  He lost to incumbent Lieutenant Governor Mazie K. Hirono.

External links 
 The Honolulu Advertiser, September 5, 2002, "Andy Anderson:  Tough, Practical, and 'Sassy'"
 https://web.archive.org/web/20160821001905/http://the.honoluluadvertiser.com/article/2007/Aug/13/ln/hawaii708130339.html%7D
 http://archives.starbulletin.com/2002/07/17/news/story10.html

1930 births
Hawaii Democrats
Hawaii Republicans
Hawaii state senators
Living people
Members of the Hawaii House of Representatives
State political party chairs of Hawaii